Issyk-Kul (also Ysyk-Köl) is an endorheic lake (i.e., without outflow) in the Northern Tian Shan mountains in Eastern Kyrgyzstan. It is the seventh-deepest lake in the world, the tenth-largest lake in the world by volume (though not in surface area) and the second-largest saline lake after the Caspian Sea.

The lake is a Ramsar site of globally significant biodiversity and forms part of the Issyk-Kul Biosphere Reserve.

Geography
It is the second-largest mountain lake in the world behind Lake Titicaca in South America.

About 118 rivers and streams flow into the lake; the largest are the Jyrgalang and Tüp. It is fed by springs, including many hot springs and snow melt. The lake has no current outlet, but some hydrologists hypothesize that the lake's water filters deep underground into the Chu River. The bottom of the lake contains the mineral monohydrocalcite: one of the few known lacustrine deposits.

The lake's southern shore is dominated by the ruggedly beautiful Teskey Ala-Too Range of the Tian Shan mountains. The northern slopes of the range are long and send a considerable flow to Issyk-Kul. Numerous streams taking their rise at the slopes flow together into comparatively large rivers. They deeply dissect the range and flow in wide valleys. On exit from mountains the rivers form large alluvial cones. In eastern part of Issyk-Kul they flow into Jyrgalang river.  
The Kungey Alatau of the Tian Shan runs parallel to the north shore. The southern slopes of the Kungey Alatau are comparatively short. Therefore, the rivers rising on them are relatively small and do not have a chance to flow together to form larger hydrographic systems. As a result, they separately empty either into Issyk-Kul or into Tüp river flowing along the range.

Administratively, the lake and the adjacent land are within Issyk-Kul Region of Kyrgyzstan.

Tourism
During the Soviet era, the lake became a popular vacation resort, with numerous sanitoria, boarding houses and vacation homes along its northern shore, many concentrated in and around the town of Cholpon-Ata. These fell on hard times after the break-up of the USSR, but now hotel complexes are being refurbished and simple private bed-and-breakfast rentals are being established for a new generation of health and leisure visitors.

The city of Karakol (formerly Przhevalsk, after the Russian explorer Przhevalsky, who died there) is the administrative seat of Issyk-Kul Region of Kyrgyzstan. It is near the east tip of the lake and is a good base for excursions into the surrounding area. Its small old core contains an impressive wooden mosque, built without metal nails by the Dungan people and a wooden Orthodox church that was used as a stable during Soviet times.

History

Issyk-Kul Lake was a stopover on the Silk Road, a land route for travelers from the Far East to Europe. The great Chinese Buddhist scholar-monk Xuanzang passed by this lake and noted the details in the classic travelogue Great Tang Records on the Western Regions in the 7th century. The lake was once a part of the territory of Qing Dynasty of China and was ceded to Russia – along with the surrounding territory – after the Treaty of Tarbagatai.

Many historians believe that the lake was the point of origin for the Black Death that plagued Europe and Asia during the early and mid-14th century. In 2022, researchers reported on the analysis of preserved genetic material from seven individuals buried in two cemeteries near Issyk-Kul and determined that the Black Death was present there in 1338 or 1339.  The plague first infected people in a small, nearby settlement of traders eight years before it devastated Eurasia, killing 60 percent of the population, having traveled along trade routes. The lake's status as a byway for travelers allowed the plague to spread across these continents via medieval merchants who unknowingly carried infested vermin along with them.

The lake level is some  higher than in medieval times. Divers have found the remains of submerged settlements in shallow areas around the lake. In December 2007, a report was released by a team of Kyrgyz historians, led by Vladimir Ploskikh, vice president of the Kyrgyz Academy of Sciences, that archaeologists have discovered the remains of a 2500-year-old advanced civilization at the bottom of the Lake.
The data and artifacts obtained suggest that the ancient city was a metropolis in its time.
Other findings included Scythian burial mounds eroded over the centuries by waves, and numerous well-preserved artifacts, including bronze battleaxes, arrowheads, self-sharpening daggers, objects discarded by smiths, casting molds, and money.

Articles identified as the world's oldest extant coins were found underwater, with gold wire rings used as small change and a large hexahedral goldpiece. Also found was a bronze cauldron with a level of craftsmanship that is today achieved by using an inert gas environment.

In 1916 the monastery at Issyk-Kul was attacked by Kyrgyz rebels, and seven monks were killed.

Environment

Specially protected areas

The first nature reserve in Kyrgyzstan, Issyk-Kul State Reserve was established in 1948 to protect unique nature landscapes and waterfowl at Issyk-Kul. In 1975, it was acknowledged as a Ramsar site. Biosphere Reserve Issyk-Kul covered by UNESCO World Network of Biosphere Reserves was established in year 2000 within the administrative borders of Issyk-Kul Region.

Fish
The lake contains highly endemic fish biodiversity, and some of the species, including four endemics, are seriously endangered. In recent years catches of all species of fish have declined markedly, due to a combination of over-fishing, heavy predation by two of the introduced species (the Pike perch and the Rainbow trout), and the cessation of lake restocking with juvenile fish from hatcheries. At least four commercially targeted endemic fish species are sufficiently threatened to be included in the Red Book of the Kyrgyz Republic: Schmidt's dace (Leuciscus schmidti), Issyk-Kul dace (Leuciscus bergi), marinka (Schizothorax issyk-kuli), and sheer or naked osman (Gymnodiptychus dybowskii). Seven other endemic species are almost certainly threatened as by-catch or are indirectly impacted by fishing activity and changes to the structure and balance of the lake's fish population.

Sevan trout, a fish endemic to Lake Sevan in Armenia, was introduced into Issyk-Kul in the 1970s. While this fish is an endangered species in its "home" lake, it has a much better chance to survive in Lake Issyk-Kul where it has ravaged the indigenous species.

Dead Lake 
There is a small lake below the water level of Issyk Kul at the south west side of the lake. This lake is called the dead lake (also Tyz köl in Kyrgyz) due to its very high saline content and swimming in the Issyk Kul dead lake is a very different experience from less salty water. The lake receives its water from small cold springs at the beach which lead the cold, less heavy water to the top of the lake and often the salty, heavy water below is oddly more warm than the water on the surface.

Creation legend 
In pre-Islamic legend, the king of the Ossounes had donkey's ears. He would hide them, and had his barbers killed to hide his secret. One barber yelled the secret into a well, but he did not cover the well afterwards. As a result, the well water rose and flooded the kingdom. The kingdom is today under the waters of Issyk-Kul. According to the legend, this is how the lake was formed. Other legends say that four drowned cities lie at the bottom of the lake. Archaeological finds indicating the presence of man-made structures have been made in shallow waters of the lake.

Russian Navy test site
During the Soviet period, the Soviet Navy operated an extensive facility at the lake's east end, where submarine and torpedo technology was evaluated. In March 2008, Kyrgyz newspapers reported that  around the Karabulan Peninsula on the lake would be leased for an indefinite period to the Russian Navy, which is planning to establish new naval testing facilities as part of the 2007 bilateral Agreement on Friendship, Cooperation, Mutual Help, and Protection of Secret Materials. The Russian military will pay $4.5 million annually to lease the area. India also plans to invest in the facility to test all types of torpedoes such as heavy weight torpedoes and those that have thermal navigation system. Another advantage that works for the testing center is that the torpedoes fired can also be recovered allowing scientists to make physical verification of a torpedo structure for further study. India is also planning to use the torpedo test facility to test the autonomous underwater vehicle being developed by NSTL. For this, India has proposed to engage local companies with know-how in torpedo technology to further co-develop the facility.

Lakeside towns
Towns and some villages around the lake, listed clockwise from the lake's western tip:
 Kosh-Köl
 Tamchy
 Cholpon-Ata (the capital of the north shore)
 Tüp
 Karakol (the regional capital near the eastern end of the lake, formerly named Przhevalsk)
 Barskoon

Notable inhabitants
Tugelbay Sydykbekov, writer

See also

Lake Ala-Kul

References

External links

 World Lake Database entry for Issyk-Kul Lake
 The Issyk-Kul Hollow at Natural Heritage Protection Fund
 Remains of ancient civilization discovered on the bottom of Issyk-Kul Lake
 Views of lake Issyk-Kul from Abasayyoh
 Jean Klerkx, Beishen Imanackunov (eds.): "Lake Issyk-Kul: Its Natural Environment". Springer, 2002. . (Searchable text on Google Books)

Ancient lakes
Archaeological sites in Kyrgyzstan
Lakes of Kyrgyzstan
Endorheic lakes of Asia
Mountain lakes
Issyk-Kul Region
Biosphere reserves of Kyrgyzstan
Ramsar sites in Kyrgyzstan
Sites along the Silk Road
Russian and Soviet Navy bases
Tian Shan
Weapons test sites